John Joseph Lattner (October 24, 1932 – February 12, 2016) was an American football player.  While playing college football for the University of Notre Dame, he won the Heisman Trophy in 1953.  He also won the Maxwell Award twice, in 1952 and 1953.  Lattner played professionally for one season in the National Football League (NFL), with the Pittsburgh Steelers in 1954.

Football career
Lattner starred in both football and basketball at Fenwick High School in Oak Park, Illinois, where he graduated in 1950. Fenwick, along with other Chicago-area Catholic schools, was a training ground for Notre Dame and Big Ten football programs, and Lattner held offers from top college football programs across the country.  He initially considered the University of Michigan because head coach Bennie Oosterbaan ran the single wing offense, a scheme that fit Lattner well at Fenwick.  Lattner eventually chose Notre Dame, which offered a Catholic education and the highest level of competition.

Lattner played halfback for the University of Notre Dame under head coach Frank Leahy from 1950 to 1953. He won the Heisman Trophy in 1953, and won the Maxwell Award twice, in 1952 and 1953.  In 1953, the Irish went 9–0–1, finishing second to Maryland in the final Associated Press poll. Lattner rushed for 651 yards (averaging 4.9 yards per carry) and scored nine touchdowns, caught 14 passes for 204 yards, had four interceptions and tallied two touchdowns on only 10 kickoff returns.

Lattner appeared on the cover of Time Magazine on November 9, 1953, with the caption "a bread and butter ball carrier", a phrase bestowed upon Lattner by Leahy.

In 1954, Lattner was drafted in the first round by the Pittsburgh Steelers, but played with them for only one season before entering the United States Air Force for two years. There, during a football game, he suffered a severe knee injury that prevented him from ever playing professional football again.  Lattner's single season in Pittsburgh was a success, as he totaled over 1,000 all purpose yards on offense and special teams.  As a result, he was named to the NFL 1954 Pro Bowl as a kick and punt returner.

Lattner coached for a period in the late 1950s, at St. Joseph's High School in Kenosha, Wisconsin and the University of Denver.  His coaching career ended in 1961 when Denver cut its football program.

Lattner was elected to the College Football Hall of Fame in 1979.

Personal
An Oak Park resident for most of his life, Lattner later lived in Melrose Park, Illinois and resided in Anna Maria Island, Florida during the winter months. He served as vice president of sales at PAL Graphics Inc. in Broadview, Illinois.

Of Irish Catholic descent, Lattner was a longtime participant in the Chicago Saint Patrick's Day Parade, often carrying the banner of Saint Patrick.  The Chicago Tribune noted that nobody "out-Irished" Lattner, who also sports a kilt and green stockings for the festivities.

In 1962, Lattner opened Johnny Lattner's Steakhouse on Madison Street in Chicago.  An electrical fire in 1968 severely damaged the restaurant and claimed three lives.  Lattner's Heisman Trophy was on display in the restaurant and was destroyed in the fire.  Lattner sent the Downtown Athletic Club a check for $300 along with newspaper coverage of the fire and received a replacement. He then operated a second restaurant at Marina City from 1968 to 1972.

A fire four years earlier had ended better for Lattner. While driving home from work in the early morning of November 17, 1963, he spotted a fire in an apartment building on the West Side of Chicago. He called the fire department, then roused 25 residents from one of the buildings and carried a five-year-old girl to safety. He was credited with helping 40 people escape injury.

In 1986, Lattner ran in the  election to be a member of the Cook County Board of Commissioners from suburban Cook County. While successful in winning the primary to be one of the Democratic Party's nominees, he failed to win election in the general election.

Lattner routinely rented out his Heisman Trophy to tailgates and other events with the proceeds donated to charity. At halftime during Fenwick's 2007 game versus Hubbard at Soldier Field, Lattner's #34 jersey was retired.

Lattner had 25 grandchildren, several of whom have also played football for Fenwick High School. Robert Spillane, a class of 2014 graduate, played football at the linebacker position for Western Michigan University, and has played in the NFL for the Tennessee Titans and the Pittsburgh Steelers. Another grandson, Ryan Smith, also graduated from Fenwick in 2014, played football at the tight end position for Miami University, and was an off-season member of the Green Bay Packers in 2018.

Lattner was 83 when he died from mesothelioma in his Melrose Park, Illinois home on February 12, 2016.

References

External links
 
 
 

1932 births
2016 deaths
American football halfbacks
American men's basketball players
Denver Pioneers football coaches
Notre Dame Fighting Irish football players
Notre Dame Fighting Irish men's basketball players
Pittsburgh Steelers players
High school football coaches in Wisconsin
All-American college football players
Eastern Conference Pro Bowl players
Heisman Trophy winners
Maxwell Award winners
Players of American football from Illinois
Sportspeople from Oak Park, Illinois
American people of Irish descent
People from Anna Maria, Florida
Catholics from Illinois
Catholics from Florida
Illinois Democrats